Kelmė District Municipality is one of 60 municipalities in Lithuania, located in western part of Lithuania.

Elderships 
Kelmė District Municipality is divided into 11 elderships:

References

 
Municipalities of Šiauliai County
Municipalities of Lithuania